Alexander Critchley (17 December 1893 – 4 September 1974) was a British Conservative politician. He was elected a Member of Parliament for Liverpool Edge Hill in 1935 until 1945, when he stood down. An accountant by profession, he was also a member of Liverpool City Council. In 1946, he was re-elected as the chairman of the Liverpool Power and Lighting Committee.

Personal life
Critchley was born in Ormskirk, Lancashire, on 17 December 1893 to William Edwin Critchley. He was educated at the University of Liverpool and in 1925 he married Lucy Lindsay. 
He died 4 September 1974.

References

External links
Mr Alexander Critchley @ theyworkforyou.com

1893 births
1974 deaths
People from Ormskirk
Alumni of the University of Liverpool
Conservative Party (UK) MPs for English constituencies
UK MPs 1935–1945
Members of the Parliament of the United Kingdom for Liverpool constituencies
Councillors in Liverpool